Calopadia granulosa is a species of corticolous (bark-dwelling), crustose lichen in the family Pilocarpaceae. Found in Brazil, it was formally described as a new species in 2014 by lichenologists André Aptroot and Marcela Cáceres. The type specimen was collected by the authors from the Parque Natural Municipal de Porto Velho (Rondônia), where it was found growing on the smooth bark of a tree in a park near a rainforest. The thallus of the lichen consists of a crust of pale greyish-green  that lacks a prothallus. They measure 33–38 by 10.5–13.0 μm; these are among the smallest ascospores found in the genus Calopadia.

References

Pilocarpaceae
Lichen species
Lichens described in 2014
Lichens of Brazil
Taxa named by André Aptroot
Taxa named by Marcela Cáceres